Corinna Scholz (born 1 August 1989 in Schongau, Bavaria) is a German curler from Bernbeuren. She competed as the alternate for Germany at the 2010 Winter Olympics. At the 2009 Aberdeen European Championships she also served as the Alternate, but was asked to play Lead in several matches.

Teammates 
2009 Aberdeen European Championships
2010 Vancouver Olympic Games
2010 Ford World Women's Curling Championship

 Andrea Schöpp, Skip
 Monika Wagner, Third
 Melanie Robillard, Second
 Stella Heiß, Lead

References

External links
 
 Team Schoepp Profile

German female curlers
Olympic curlers of Germany
Curlers at the 2010 Winter Olympics
World curling champions
1989 births
Living people
European curling champions
Sportspeople from Upper Bavaria
People from Weilheim-Schongau